George Conditt IV (born August 22, 2000) is Puerto Rican professional basketball player for Promitheas Patras of the Greek Basket League and the EuroCup. He represents the Puerto Rican national basketball team in international basketball competitions. Conditt played college basketball for the Iowa State Cyclones.

Early life 
Conditt was born in Chicago, Illinois. He attended Corliss High School. He was an honor student. As a senior, he averaged 14.7 points, 17.0 rebounds and 8.0 blocks per game. He led Corliss to a 24–5 record, failing to reach the school’s first state tournament appearance by one game. He was selected to the Class 2A first-team All-State, the Chicago Sun-Times Class 2A second-team and was an All-Area honorable mention. Conditt was also selected to the USA Today All-USA high school basketball team Illinois Boys Basketball second team. He played in the City + Suburban All-Star Game and Prep Ball Stars Midwest Challenge. Ranked  a three-star recruit by 247Sports, ESPN and Rivals.com, he picked Iowa State over Illinois and New Mexico.

College career 
As a freshman in 2018–2019, Conditt played in 26 games, averaging 8.0 minutes per game along with 2.0 points, 1.7 rebounds and 1.0 blocks. As a sophomore, he was one of four Cyclones to play in all 32 games, making seven starts. He averaged 16.3 minutes, 7.0 points, 4.9 rebounds and was sixth in the Big 12 Conference men's basketball averaging 1.6 blocks. As a junior,  Conditt was one of two Cyclones to play in all 24 games, making three starts. He averaged 2.4 points, 3.6 rebounds and was ninth in the Big 12 averaging 0.9 blocks. As a senior, he played in all 35 games, making 26 starts in his final season with the team. He averaged 4.9 points and 3.5 rebounds, and shot a career-best 66.3 percent from the field and 70.5 percent at the free-throw line. He also dished out a career-high 67 assists, becoming one of just four Big 12 players in the last 10 seasons 6'9 or taller with at least 65 assists. He recorded 30 blocks as a senior and finished his career with 128, the fourth-most in school history. As a No. 11 seed in the NCAA tournament, Iowa State defeated LSU in the first round and Wisconsin in the second round before falling to Miami in the Sweet Sixteen. Conditt scored 8 points in the loss, which marked his final collegiate game. At the conclusion of the 2021–2022 season, Conditt announced he would leave Iowa State and pursue professional basketball.

Professional career 
Conditt was drafted with the second overall pick in the 2022 Baloncesto Superior Nacional draft by the Gigantes de Carolina. On April 7, 2022, Conditt officially signed with the Gigantes.

On September 16, 2022, Conditt signed with Greek club Promitheas Patras.

National team career 
Although a native of Chicago, Conditt represents Puerto Rico at the international level due to his mother's Puerto Rican ancestry. At the 2018 FIBA Under-18 Americas Championship, he averaged 11.8 points, 6.7 rebounds and 3.3 blocks, helping lead the team to a fourth-place finish.

In 2021, he averaged 14.5 points and 3.5 rebounds in two games while playing for Puerto Rico at the Olympic Qualifying Tournament in Belgrade, Serbia. He shot 76.5 percent from the field in the event, highlighted by a game against Serbia where he shot 9-for-10 from the field and scored 20 points. The next game he netted nine points and had four rebounds against Italy.

Conditt plays center for the national team.

Personal life 
Conditt’s father, George Conditt III, played defensive lineman for Iowa State Cyclones football in the 1990’s, lettering twice. His mother, Carol, taught him Spanish and instilled in him the desire to play for Puerto Rico. He is one of five children of the couple. He is a member of Phi Beta Sigma Fraternity, Inc.

References

External links 
 ESPN.com profile

2000 births
Living people
21st-century African-American sportspeople
American men's basketball players
American expatriate basketball people in Greece
American people of Puerto Rican descent
Basketball players from Illinois
Iowa State Cyclones men's basketball players
Baloncesto Superior Nacional players
Promitheas Patras B.C. players
Puerto Rico men's national basketball team players
Sportspeople from Chicago